Glenn or Glen Cohen may refer to:

Glen Cohen (born 1954), Jamaican-born British runner
I. Glenn Cohen (born 1978), Canadian academic

See also
Cohen (surname)